XTL or xtl may refer to:

 XTL, the IATA code for Tadoule Lake Airport, Manitoba, Canada
 xtl, the ISO 639-3 code for Tijaltepec Mixtec language, Oaxaca, Mexico